Bogusław Marian Liberadzki (pronounced ; born 12 September 1948 in Sochaczew) is a Polish economist and politician. He has been a Member of the European Parliament (MEP) since 2004.

Biography
Bogusław Liberadzki is a professor of economics. He was educated at Main School of Planning and Statistics (now Warsaw School of Economics) and the University of Illinois. He holds the Chair of Transportation at the Warsaw School of Economics in Warsaw (Szkoła Główna Handlowa w Warszawie - SGH) and is also a professor in the Maritime University of Szczecin (Akademia Morska w Szczecinie).

He was an under secretary (vice minister) in the Ministry of Transportation and Maritime Economy 1989–1993 and minister in that ministry 1993–1997. Between 1997 and 2003 he was an MP (member of Sejm, lower house of Polish parliament) representing Democratic Left Alliance. Since 2003 he has sat in the European Parliament, first as a permanent observer and then on 1 May 2003 he was appointed an MEP. He is currently vice president of the European Parliament and a member of two committees: Budgetary Control and Transport and Tourism.

Personal life
He has a wife, Grażyna and two sons (identical twins) - Kamil (MA) and Marcin (PhD), both working at the Department of Banking of the SGH.

References

External links
 Bogusław Liberadzki's homepage 
 Photograph of young Kamil and Marcin Liberadzki with their mother

1948 births
Living people
Democratic Left Alliance politicians
Members of the Polish Sejm 1997–2001
Members of the Polish Sejm 2001–2005
Democratic Left Alliance MEPs
MEPs for Poland 2004
MEPs for Poland 2004–2009
MEPs for Poland 2009–2014
MEPs for Poland 2014–2019
MEPs for Poland 2019–2024
People from Sochaczew
SGH Warsaw School of Economics alumni
Academic staff of the SGH Warsaw School of Economics
Polish economists
Government ministers of Poland
Fulbright alumni